Ian Charles Sutherland (November 15, 1935 – 1999) was a Welsh international lawn bowls player.

Bowls career
He represented Wales during the Lawn bowls at the 1974 British Commonwealth Games. Four years later, he won a bronze medal in the men's fours at the 1978 Commonwealth Games in Edmonton with Ellis Stanbury, Gwyn Evans, and John Thomson.

He won a national pairs title in 1971 when he was with the Ebbw Vale club.

References

Welsh male bowls players
Commonwealth Games bronze medallists for Wales
Bowls players at the 1974 British Commonwealth Games
Bowls players at the 1978 Commonwealth Games
Commonwealth Games medallists in lawn bowls
1935 births
1999 deaths
Medallists at the 1978 Commonwealth Games